October Films was a major U.S. independent film production company and distributor founded in 1991 by Bingham Ray and Jeff Lipsky as a means of distributing the 1990 film Life Is Sweet.

A series of mergers and acquisitions began when Universal Pictures (then a division of the Seagram Company) bought a majority stake in October Films in 1997.  Universal then sold its shares to Barry Diller in 1999, who renamed the company USA Films and merged it with Gramercy Pictures. Vivendi then acquired USA Films, who in 2002 acquired Good Machine and merged it with USA Films, forming Focus Features.

Filmography

1990s

2000s

Distributor
 Rebro Adama (1990) (1992)
 Tous les matins du monde (1991) (1992)
 Two Mikes Don't Make a Wright (1992) (1993)
 Un coeur en hiver (1992) (1993)
 Bad Behaviour (1993)
 The War Room (1993)
 Dellamorte Dellamore (1994) (1996)
 Le Colonel Chabert (1994)
 Moving the Mountain (1994) (1995)
 Pao Da Shuang Deng (1994) (1995)
 Mécaniques célestes (1995) (1996)
 Badkonake sefid (White Balloon) (1995) (1996)
 Hollow Point (1996)
 Natural Enemy (1997)
 Kicked in the Head (1997)
 24 7: Twenty Four Seven (1997) (1998)
 The Peacekeeper (1997)
 The Death Train (1998)
 Touch of Evil (1958) (1998)
 Thick as Thieves (1998)
 Testimone dello sposo, Il (1998) (1999)
 Conte d'automne (1998) (1999)
 The Best Man (1999/II film) (1999/II)
 Trippin' (1999)
 Detour'' (1999)

References

External links
 October Films at IMDb
 Focus Features
 October Films UK

Film distributors of the United States
Film production companies of the United States
Mass media companies established in 1991
1991 establishments in the United States
American independent film studios
Universal Pictures